Neil Duff (born 22 July 1972) is a Northern Irish professional darts player who plays in World Darts Federation (WDF) events. He is the current World Darts Federation world champion, having won the 2022 WDF World Darts Championship and first Northern Irish player as number one in the WDF World Men's Ranking.

Career
Duff reached the Quarter-finals of the 2019 One80 World Masters after beating Dave Parletti and Gary Stone, before losing to John O'Shea by 1–4 (s).

Duff won the 2022 WDF World Darts Championship, defeating Thibault Tricole in the final, becoming the first Northern Irish world darts champion.

World Championship performances

WDF
 2022: Winner (beat Thibault Tricole 6–5)
 2023:

WSDT
 2023: Quarter-finals (lost to Robert Thornton 1–3)

Career finals

WDF major finals: (1 title)

References

Living people
1972 births
Darts players from Northern Ireland
British Darts Organisation players
WDF world darts champions